The Auburn Metropolitan Area—officially the Auburn-Opelika, Alabama Metropolitan Statistical Area—is a metro area in east-central Alabama with a 2016 population of 158,991.  It was the 19th fastest growing metro area in the United States between 1990 and 2000. The Auburn Metro area consists of Lee County, and includes the cities of Auburn (population 76,143), Opelika (population 27,443), and the northernmost portion of Phenix City (population 36,487).

Incorporated communities
Auburn
Loachapoka
Notasulga (part)
Opelika
Phenix City (part)
Smiths Station
Waverly (part)

Unincorporated communities
Beauregard
Bee Hive
Beulah
Gold Hill
Marvyn
Salem
The Bottle

See also
Greater Columbus, Georgia

References

 
Geography of Lee County, Alabama
Auburn, Alabama
Metropolitan areas of Alabama